Lipkemera is a genus of crabs in the family Xanthidae. It was originally named Meriola, but this name was preoccupied, having been used for a genus of spiders in 1895. The genus was renamed Lipkemera in 2010. It contains the following species:

 Lipkemera acutidens (Sakai, 1969)
 Lipkemera corallina (Takeda & Marumura, 1997)
 Lipkemera rufomaculata (Davie, 1993)

References

Xanthoidea